Alec Robertson (11 December 1877 – 28 October 1941) was a Scotland international rugby union player.

Rugby Union career

Amateur career

He played for Watsonians in 1896.

Robertson played rugby union for Edinburgh Academicals in 1897.

Provincial career

He played for Edinburgh District in their inter-city match against Glasgow District in 1896.

International career

Robertson was capped once by Scotland, in 1897.

Outside of rugby union

He was one of the landed gentry with the family name of Robertson-Durham. He was a chartered accountant and Justice of the Peace.

He died in 1941 and is buried in the graveyard of Dirleton Kirk.

References

1877 births
1941 deaths
Scottish rugby union players
Scotland international rugby union players
Edinburgh Academicals rugby union players
Edinburgh District (rugby union) players
Watsonians RFC players
Rugby union players from Edinburgh
Rugby union centres